Tarlac, officially the Province of Tarlac, is a landlocked province in the Philippines located in the Central Luzon region. Its capital is the city of Tarlac. It is bounded on the north by the province of Pangasinan, Nueva Ecija on the east, Zambales on the west and Pampanga in the south. The province comprises three congressional districts and is subdivided into 17 municipalities and one city, Tarlac City, which is the provincial capital.

The province is situated in the heartland of Luzon, in what is known as the Central Plain also spanning the neighbouring provinces of Pampanga, Pangasinan, Nueva Ecija and Bulacan.

Early in history, what came to be known as Valenzuela Ranch today was once a thickly-forested area, peopled by roving tribes of nomadic Aetas who are said to be the aboriginal settlers of the Philippines, and for a lengthy period, it was the remaining hinterland of Luzon's Central Plains. Today, Tarlac is the most multi-cultural of the provinces in the region for having a mixture of four distinct ethnic groups: the Kapampangans, the Pangasinans, the Ilocanos and the Tagalogs. It is also known for its fine food and vast sugar and rice plantations in Central Luzon.

History

Spanish colonial era 
Tarlac's name is a Hispanized derivation from a talahib weed called Malatarlak, a Pangasinan term. Tarlac was originally divided into two parts: the southern division belonging to Pampanga and the northern division belonging to Pangasinan. It was the last province in Central Luzon to be organized under the Spanish colonial administration in 1874. Its nucleus were the towns of Concepcion, Capas, Bamban, Mabalacat, Magalang, Porac, Floridablanca, Victoria, and Tarlac which constituted a military comandancia. Some of these municipalities were returned to Pampanga but the rest were incorporated into the new province of Tarlac.

Unlike other provinces in Central Luzon, Tarlac was relatively free from revolts during the Spanish regime before the late 1800s rose. Only the rebellion started by Juan de la Cruz Palaris in Pangasinan spread to the northern portion of Tarlac.

Philippine Revolution and American colonial era
During the Philippine Revolution of 1896, Tarlac was among the first eight provinces to rise against Spain, alongside neighbouring Pampanga. It became the new seat of the first Philippine Republic in March 1899 when General Emilio Aguinaldo abandoned the former capital, Malolos, Bulacan. This lasted only for a month before the seat was moved to Nueva Ecija in Aguinaldo's attempt to elude the pursuing Americans.

On October 23, 1899, Gregorio Aglipay, military vicar general of the revolutionary forces, called the Filipino clergy to a conference in Paniqui. There, they drafted the constitution of the Philippine Independent Church. They called for the Filipinization of the clergy, which eventually led to a separation from the Roman Catholic Church in the Philippines.

Tarlac was captured by American forces in November 1899. A civil government was established in the province in 1901.

World War II 
During World War II, Camp O'Donnell in Capas became the terminal point of the infamous Bataan Death March of Filipino and American soldiers who surrendered at Bataan on April 9, 1942. Many prisoners died of hunger, disease and/or execution. The general headquarters of the Philippine Commonwealth Army was established from January 3, 1942, to June 30, 1946, and the 3rd Constabulary Regiment of the Philippine Constabulary was founding again from October 28, 1944, to June 30, 1946, and military stationed in the province of Tarlac and some parts in Central Luzon due to Japanese Occupation. Local troops of the Philippine Commonwealth Army units has sending the clearing military operations in the province of Tarlac and Central Luzon from 1942 to 1945 and aided them by the recognized guerrilla groups including Hukbalahap Communist fighters and attacking Japanese Imperial forces. But in the aftermath, some local guerrilla resistance fighters and Hukbahalap groups are became retreating Imperial Japanese troops around the province and before the liberation from the Allied forces.

In early 1945, combined American and Filipino military forces with the recognized Aringay Command guerrillas liberated Camp O'Donnell. The raid in Capas resulted in the rescue of American, Filipino and other allied Prisoners of War.

From January 20, 1945, to August 15, 1945, Tarlac was recaptured by combined Filipino and American troops together with the recognized guerrilla fighters against the Japanese Imperial forces during the liberation and beginning for the Battle of Tarlac under the Luzon Campaign.

Recent history

Military testing ground
Recently, the Philippine Army has used Crow Valley in the borders of Barangay Patling and Santa Lucia in Capas, Tarlac as a testing ground for both Philippine forces and allies. Many of the Philippine military testings were done on March 17, 2006 most likely as a part of Operation Enduring Freedom - Philippines.

Geography

The landlocked province is situated at the center of the central plains of Luzon, landlocked by four provinces: Pampanga on the south, Nueva Ecija on the east, Pangasinan on the north, and Zambales on the west. Approximately 75% of the province is plains while the rest is hilly to slightly mountainous.

Eastern Tarlac is a plain, while Western Tarlac is hilly to slightly mountainous. Because of this, the province includes a large portion of mountains like Mt. Telakawa (Straw Hat Mountain), located at Capas, Tarlac. Mt. Bueno, Mt. Mor-Asia and Mt. Canouman are also located in Capas as well as Mt. Dalin. The other mountains are Mt. Dueg and Mt. Maasin, found in the municipality of San Clemente. Also noted are Mt. Damas of Camiling. A portion of Mount Pinatubo (whose summit crater rests in neighbouring Zambales) also rests in Bamban and Capas. The whole of Mayantoc and San Jose are mountainous so it is suitable for the highest natural resources and forest products in the province such as coal, iron, copper, temperate-climate fruits and vegetables, fire logs, sand, rocks and forest animals such as wild boar and deer. The main water sources for agriculture include the Tarlac River at Tarlac City, the Lucong and Parua rivers in Concepcion, Sacobia-Bamban River in Bamban and the Rio Chico in La Paz.

Administrative divisions
Tarlac is subdivided into 17 municipalities and 1 component city, all encompassed by three congressional districts. There are a total of 511 barangays comprising the province.

Barangays
The 17 municipalities and 1 city of the province comprise a total of 511 barangays, with Cristo Rey in Capas as the most populous in 2010, and Malonzo in Bamban as the least.

Climate
Like the rest of Central Luzon, the province has three distinct seasons: summer from March to June, monsoon rain from July to early October, and monsoon winter from late October to February. Summer months, especially during May bring frequent, sometimes severe, thunderstorms with high winds, thunder, and hail. It is also the windiest province in the region during February and March due to its widely lowland altitude and extreme climate transition.

Demographics

There are two predominant ethnic groups in the province: the Kapampangans that mainly predominate the province's southern portion and the Pangasinans that mainly predominate the province's northern portion. Both ethno-linguistic groups intermingle together in the provincial capital. The Tagalogs and Ilocanos constitute the rest of the provincial populace; Tagalogs arrived from Nueva Ecija and Bulacan, others from Zambales and Bataan.

Language
Kapampangan and Pangasinan are mainly used throughout the entire province, as well as Ilocano and Tagalog. Ilocanos and Tagalogs however, speak their respective languages with a Kapampangan/Pangasinan accent, as descendants of Ilocanos and Tagalogs from the first generations who lived in the province learned Kapampangan and/or Pangasinan. As Tarlac is part of Central Luzon, Tagalog/Filipino is spoken as lingua franca between different languages. English is widely spoken and understood as well, especially in professional and educational establishments.

Religion

Spanish influence is very visible in the province as shown by religious adherence. Roman Catholicism is professed by 80%-83% of the population. Protestant groups are also present such as evangelicals forming 8% of the province population. The St. Michael Archangel Parish Church in Camiling was the oldest religious structure in the entire province until it was burned in 1997.

Muslims, Anitists, animists, and atheists are also present in the province.

Economy

The economy of Tarlac is predominantly agricultural. It is among the biggest producers of rice and sugarcane (the principal crops) in Central Luzon. Other major crops are corn and coconuts, fruits (bananas, calamansi and mangoes) and vegetables (eggplants, garlic and onions).

Because the province is landlocked, its fish production is limited to fishpens, but it has vast river systems and irrigation. On the Zambales boundary to its west, forest land provides timber for the logging industry. Mineral reserves such as manganese and iron can also be found along the western section.

Tarlac has its own rice and corn mills, sawmills and logging outfits. It has three sugar-refining centrals and hosts many sugar products in Central Luzon, especially the Muscovado sugar of the municipality of Victoria. Other firms service agricultural needs such as fertilizers. Among its cottage industries, ceramics has become available because of the abundant supply of clay. Some of the major industries here involve making chicharon (pork skin chips) and iniruban in the municipality of Camiling and Ilang-Ilang products of Anao. Tilapia production is also improving in Tarlac, with an aim to make the province the second "Tilapia Capital of Central Luzon" after its mother province, Pampanga.

Infrastructure

Electricity

Religion

The province of Tarlac is composed of many religious groups, but it is predominantly Roman Catholic (79.55%).

According to 2010 Census, other prominent Christian groups include the Iglesia ni Cristo (7.43%), Aglipayan Church  (2.24%), Evangelicals (1.97%), Jehovah’s Witness (0.64%) and many others.

Culture

Belenismo sa Tarlac
Belenismo sa Tarlac was launched by Isabel Cojuangco-Suntay, sister of former Ambassador Eduardo Cojuangco Jr., to transform the province into the Belén Capital of the Philippines. The Belen Festival began in September 2007, with the first Belen-making workshop conducted on December 16, 2007. Organizers have intended the festival to become an annual event in the province. Senator Loren Legarda led the awarding of the first Belen-making competition where Tarlac PNP Office Belen, built by at least 24 policemen, won the first prize.

Belenismo in Spanish means the art of making Belén, a representation of the Nativity scene in which the Holy Family (Joseph, Mary and the infant Jesus) is visited by the three wise men who came to the manger through the guidance of a star.

Chicharon Iniruban Festival
It is a festivity that is yearly celebrated in the town of Camiling during the last week of October. It is intended as a preparation for All Saints' Day and a Thanksgiving Celebration for the good harvest and for the good quality of meat products especially the chicharon or Bagnet. It also features the exotic and delicious rice cake Iniruban, as called by Ilocanos. The festival's highlights are the street dancing competition, Miss Iniruban beauty pageant, and the municipality's agri-trade. It is the oldest cultural celebration in the province introduced in 2000.

Provincial capitol
The highest seat of political power of the province is located on a hill in Barangay San Vicente, Tarlac City. The present structure was finished in 1909. During the Japanese occupation, the provincial capitol was vacated and used as the provincial headquarters of the Imperial Army. The capitol suffered great damages during the Second World War, but afterwards, in 1946, the United States of America helped rebuild and improve its structure. Because of its historical background, the picture of the capitol façade appeared in the previous version of the 500 peso bill.

Notable people

National heroes and patriots 

Francisco Makabulos – Filipino Revolutionary General, and former Governor of Tarlac
Servillano Aquino – Filipino Revolutionary General
Benigno Aquino Jr. – former Philippine senator and opposition leader during Martial Law dictatorship of dictator Ferdinand Marcos

Politics and government 

Corazon Aquino – 11th President of the Philippines
Benigno Aquino III – 15th President of the Philippines
Carlos P. Romulo – 4th President of the United Nations General Assembly, 14th Secretary of the Department of the Foreign Affairs, 11th President of the University of the Philippines, and National Artist of the Philippines for Literature
Onofre Corpuz – 23rd Secretary of the Department of Education, 13th President of the University of the Philippines, and National Scientist of the Philippines for Political Economics and Government
Horacio Morales – 8th Secretary of the Department of Agrarian Reform
Alberto Romulo –  23rd Secretary of the Department of the Foreign Affairs, 34th Executive Secretary of the Philippines
Jesli Lapus – 31st Secretary of the Department of Trade and Industry, and 34th Secretary of the Department of Education
Gilbert Teodoro – 25th Secretary of the Department of National Defense
Voltaire Gazmin – 26th Secretary of the Department of National Defense
Benigno Aquino Sr. – 6th Speaker of the House of Representatives of the Philippines, and 10th Secretary of the Department of Agriculture and former Philippine senator
Macario Peralta Jr. – former Philippine senator, and 13th Secretary of the Department of National Defense
Jose Roy – former Philippine senator
Eva Estrada Kalaw – former Philippine senator
Tessie Aquino-Oreta – former Philippine senator
César Bengzon – 9th Chief Justice of the Supreme Court of the Philippines, and first Filipino Justice of the International Court of Justice
Jesus Barrera – 67th Associate Justice of the Supreme Court of the Philippines
Paulino Santos – 2nd Chief of Staff of the Armed Forces of the Philippines
Ricardo David – 41st Chief of Staff of the Armed Forces of the Philippines

Historical Personalities 

Leonor Rivera – José Rizal's second cousin and love interest well known as Maria Clara.
Bernabe Buscayno – founder of the New People's Army, the military wing of the Communist Party of the Philippines.

Arts and Sciences 

 Gregorio C. Brillantes - A multi-awarded fiction writer.
Alex Niño - Filipino comics artist best known for his work for the American publishers DC Comics, Marvel Comics, and Warren Publishing, and in Heavy Metal magazine.
Xiao Chua - public historian

Religion 

Alberto Ramento - ninth Supreme Bishop and Chairperson of the Supreme Council of Bishops of the Iglesia Filipina Independiente (IFI).

Business 

Danding Cojuangco - chairman and CEO of San Miguel Corporation, the largest food and beverage corporation in the Philippines and Southeast Asia. He  was widely considered a crony during the Marcos regime.

See also
 Roman Catholic Diocese of Tarlac
 Super regions of the Philippines
 Pampanga
 Pangasinan

References

External links

 
 
 Official Portal of the Province of Tarlac

 
Provinces of the Philippines
Provinces of Central Luzon
States and territories established in 1872
1872 establishments in the Philippines